Neuner is a German occupational surname, which originally meant a person who was on a council of nine members (literally, a "niner"), derived from the Middle High German niun ("nine"). The name may refer to:

Angelika Neuner (born 1969), Austrian luger 
Doris Neuner (born 1971), Austrian luger
Frank Neuner (born 1971), German psychologist
Magdalena Neuner (born 1987), German athlete
Martin Neuner (1900–1944), German ski jumper

See also
Mount Neuner, Antarctica

References

German-language surnames